Karczemka Kierzkowska  is a settlement in the administrative district of Gmina Choczewo, within Wejherowo County, Pomeranian Voivodeship, in northern Poland.

For details of the history of the region, see History of Pomerania.

References

Karczemka Kierzkowska